Łękinia is a former PKP railway station in Łękinia (Pomeranian Voivodeship), Poland.

Lines crossing the station

References 
Łękinia article at Polish Stations Database, URL accessed at 7 March 2006

Railway stations in Pomeranian Voivodeship
Disused railway stations in Pomeranian Voivodeship
Człuchów County